C. V. Pappachan (born 20 May 1965) is a former Indian football player and a retired police officer from Thrissur, Kerala. He captained India in a couple of tournaments.

Career
Born in Parappur in Thrissur district, Pappachan turned professional in 1982 and played as a striker.  Prior to being recruited for Kerala Police team by the then DGP M. K. Joseph, he played as striker representing Sree Kerala Varma college and Calicut University and played in an international university tournament in Japan. He played for Kerala Police team during 1982-1998 and for FC Kochin during 1998-99. Pappachan captained Kerala Police team and Kerala State team. He also represented India in many tournaments including the 1987 Calicut Nehru Cup International Football Tournament and the 1991 Thiruvananthapuram Nehru Cup. He scored the lone goal for India when they met Hungary 1991 edition of Nehru Cup. Pappachan played in the Indian senior B National Team at the Sri Lanka Independence Cup in 1998. He represented Kerala in the Santosh Trophy tournament eight times. He has also played in many national and international tournaments. He served as Deputy Commandant in India Reserve Battalion, Thrissur. He was conferred the President's police medal in 2020. He retired from Kerala Police on 31 May 2021.

Games and tournaments
In a career spanning over a decade, Pappachan has played for several clubs and represented Calicut University, his home state Kerala, and India.

University level
1983, 1984 : Calicut University
1985 : Indian Universities Team

Club level
From 1985 : Kerala Police
1997, 1998 : FC Cochin
From 1998 : Kerala Police

Santosh Trophy
From 1986 to 1996 Played eight times for Kerala State
1986 : Jabalpur (semifinal)
1987 : Calcutta (semifinal)
1988 : Kollam (runnerup)
1989 : Guwahati (runnerup)
1992 : Coimbatore (champion)
1993 : Kochi (Champion)
1995 : Cuttack (runnerup)
1996 : Goa Captain (semifinal)

National Games
1987 : Thiruvananthapuram (winners)
1994 : Pune (runnerup)

Indian team
1987 : SAF Games: Calcutta, Reserve
1987 : Nehru Cup, Kozhikode
1989 : Saf Games, Pakistan
1989 : Presidents Gold Cup, Dhakka
1990 : Saf Games, Sri Lanka
1991 : Super Soccer Series, Sri Lanka, Bangalore
1991 : Nehru Cup, Thiruvananthapuram
1993 : Pre World Cup, Eligibility Match, Beirut, Korea
1994 : Bristol Freedom Cup, Sri Lanka, Winners

Percussionist
Pappachan  made his debut as a Panchari Melam performer at a function in the Thekkinkad Maidan on 31 August 2009. Speaker of Kerala legislative assembly K. Radhakrishnan inaugurated the function. He is now a trained percussionist.

Achievements
1989 : Durand Cup, Delhi, Best Player
1993 : Federation Cup, Best Player
1993 : Oktopalas Award, Thrissur
1994 : Best Player Award from Kerala Government, Prize money of One lakh rupees
1996 : Jimmy George Award
1996 : T. Aboobekker Award, Kozhikode
1997 : Kerala Football Association Best Player Award (G. V. Raja)
2009 : E.C. Bharathan Memorial Trophy, Kozhikode.

References

External links
Kerala Police - Sports and Games

Indian footballers
India international footballers
Footballers from Thrissur
Malayali people
1965 births
Living people
Sree Kerala Varma College alumni
Association football forwards